Angamaly Diocese is one of the ancient dioceses of Malankara Orthodox Church in India and covers a wider area including big portions of Ernakulam and Idukki Districts.Angamaly Diocese is one of the 30 dioceses of the Malankara Orthodox Syrian Church having its see at Kottayam, in Kerala, India. Angamaly Diocese was formed in the historic synod of Mulanthuruthy in 1876.

Diocesan Metropolitans
The present diocesan head is Bishop Yuhanon Mar Policarpus, who took charge in February 2009.
Former Metropolitans
Kadavil Paulose Mar Athanasiose
Pilikottil Joseph Mar Dionysius
Paulose Mar Athanasios|Geevarghese Mar Gregorios
1967–1974 Philipose Mar Theophilose
1978–1982 Mathews Mar Barnabas
2009–Yuhanon Mar Policarpus

Parishes 

 Angamaly Mar Gregorios Orthodox Church
 Angamaly St Mary's Orthodox Church (Ist marthoma tomb)***
 Adimali St Thomas
 Aluva Thrikunnathu Seminary Church
 Aluva College Hill St. Thomas Church
 Ayamkara St George
 Chathamattom Shalom Orthodox Church
 Chathamattom St.Peters and St.Pauls Orthodox Church
 Eloor Mar Gregorios Orthodox Church
 Erattiyanikunnu St George Orthodox Church
 Josegiri St Mary's Orthodox Church
 Kalamassery St George Orthodox Church
 Kakkanadu St Thomas
 Kottapady St George
 Kavalangadu St John's
 Kambilikandam St Mary's
 Kothamangalam Marthoma
 Keezhillom Udayagiri Mar Gregorios
 Kodanadu Mar Malke
 Kodanadu Sehion
 Kunnakurudy St. George Cathedral
 Kothamangalam Mar Baselious
 Kurupampady St. Thomas Catholicate church
 Kutta St George
 Kulaparachal Bethlehem St. Mary's
 Kizhakambalam St Marys Orthodox church (Kizhakambalam Dayara)
 Kizhakambalam St Peter's and St Paul's
 Mudavoor St George Orthodox church
 East Marady St Gregorios Orthodox church
 Mulavoor Kyamtha
 Mullaringad St Mary's Orthodox Church
 Munnar St Mary's Orthodox Church
 Mazhuvanoor St Thomas
 Nagancheri Church
 Odakali St Mary's Orthodox Church
 Peechanicadu St George Orthodox church
 Pazhamthottam St Marys Orthodox Church
 Pallikara Mar Baselious
 Perumbavoor Bethel Suluko Orthodox Church
 Pukkatupady St George
 Pothinicad St Mary's Orthodox Mahaidavaka
 Pulinthanam St John's
 Vengoor St Thomas
 Veetor St Mary's

Statistics 
Parishes:44
Priests:44
Population:50,000

See also
Malankara Orthodox Syrian Church

External links
Website of Malankara Orthodox Church
Indian Christianity

Malankara Orthodox Syrian Church dioceses
1876 establishments in India